Felipe Augusto de Saint-Marcq (or Saint-March) (1762 in Taintignies, Belgium – 1831 in Madrid) was a military officer born in Belgium in the service of the Spanish Crown. He served in the Peninsular War, commanding the Spanish forces during the Battle of Valencia.

Early career 
Saint-Marcq entered the Spanish army when he was 14 years old as a member of the Walloon Guards, a unit recruited in Spanish Belgium or Wallonia.

Peninsular War

When the war broke out, he was a gazetted company captain and was able to escape from Madrid when it was occupied by the invading French Army. He made his way to Valencia with his army where he was able to help lift the French siege led by Marshal Bon-Adrien Jeannot de Moncey. For this action, he was promoted to the rank of Mariscal de Campo.

Saint-Marcq was later crucial in the lifting of the Siege of Zaragoza where he came to the aid of José de Palafox y Melzi and routed the besieging forces of French General Verdier.

Saint-Marcq remained under the orders of Palafox in Zaragoza and actively participated in the defense of the city for which he was promoted to lieutenant general. When the city eventually surrendered to the French, he was taken prisoner and sent to Nancy where he would remain until the end of the war in 1814.

When Ferdinand VII of Spain returned to the throne, Saint-Marcq returned to Spain. He was promoted to Captain General of Galicia, Valencia and of Aragon until 1830.

Death 
Saint-Marcq died in Madrid in 1831 from one of the cholera epidemics that plagued Spain in the mid to late 1800s.

References 

1762 births
1831 deaths
Spanish generals
Spanish commanders of the Napoleonic Wars
Military leaders of the French Revolutionary Wars
Captain Generals of Galicia